

The Faculty Office of the Archbishop of Canterbury is a regulatory body in English law, which also exercises some adjudicatory functions. Its responsibilities include:

 the regulation of notaries public;
 the issue of special marriage licences (but not common marriage licences);
 the conferral of Lambeth degrees.

The Faculty Office is presided over by the Master of the Faculties, who is appointed by the Archbishop of Canterbury subject to approval by the Crown. Its jurisdiction is exercised by the Court of Faculties and applies to England and Wales. The jurisdiction was conferred upon the Archbishop by the Ecclesiastical Licences Act 1533 (25 Hen VIII c 21) (Eng) as part of the Reformation in England. This Act transferred to the Archbishop of Canterbury powers which had up until then been exercised by the Papal Legate to England. For this reason they are sometimes called the "legatine powers", and are exercised by the Archbishop of Canterbury not only in the Province of Canterbury but also in the Province of York 
and the area covered by the Church in Wales.

Notaries public in New Zealand and the State of Queensland, Australia are still appointed by the Faculty Office.

See also
 Ecclesiastical law
 Ecclesiastical court

Further reading
 
Chambers, D. S. (ed.) (1966) Faculty Office Registers, 1534-1549: a calendar of the first two registers of the Archbishop of Canterbury's Faculty Office. Oxford

Notes

References

External links
 Official website

Canon law of the Church of England
Ecclesiastical courts